Korean comfort women may refer to:
 Comfort women from Korea ruled by the Japanese Empire (before 1945)
 Western princess in South Korea (after 1945)
 Korean Women's Volunteer Labour Corps (Korean:), mistranslated as Korean comfort women corps